Agung Prasetyo (born January 16, 1978 in Surabaya) is an Indonesian footballer who currently plays for Persisam Putra Samarinda in the Indonesia Super League.

Club statistics

References

External links

1978 births
Association football goalkeepers
Living people
Javanese people
Indonesian footballers
Liga 1 (Indonesia) players
Persisam Putra Samarinda players
Indonesian Premier Division players
Deltras F.C. players
Mitra Kukar players
Persis Solo players
Sportspeople from Surabaya